Charlie Steven Allen (born 22 November 2003) is a Northern Irish footballer who plays as a midfielder or forward for Leeds United and Northern Ireland U17's.

Club career

Linfield
Having progressed through the academy of local club Linfield, Allen made his senior debut for the club on 27 April 2019 in a 1–1 draw with Coleraine. Upon making his debut, aged 15 years, 5 months and 5 days, he became the club's youngest debutant and set teammate Daniel Reynolds up for Linfield's goal.

He was named in Linfield's 25 man Champions League squad against Rosenborg BK by manager David Healy.

Leeds United
On 27 July 2020, the Yorkshire Evening Post revealed that Allen had agreed a deal with newly-promoted Premier League side Leeds United. The move was officially announced on 11 August, with Allen signing a three-year deal. Allen made his competitive debut for Leeds by playing for Leeds United Under 21's playing in the EFL Trophy defeat against Accrington Stanley on 8 September 2020, Allen was given the squad number 70 for the 2020–21 Leeds United F.C. season. He signed his first professional contract with Leeds United in December 2020, agreeing a deal lasting until summer 2023. In August 2022 his contract was extended to the end of the 2023-24 season.

Career statistics

References

2003 births
Living people
Association footballers from Northern Ireland
Association football midfielders
Linfield F.C. players
Northern Ireland youth international footballers
Leeds United F.C. players